Aiyegbusi is a surname. Notable people with the surname include:

 Babatunde Aiyegbusi (born 1988), Polish footballer and wrestler
 Korede Aiyegbusi (born 1988), English footballer
 Olukayode Aiyegbusi, Nigerian actor
 , UConn Huskies basketball player